Kentucky Route 56 (KY 56) is a  state highway in Kentucky that runs from Illinois Route 13 (IL 13) near Old Shawneetown, Illinois, on the Shawneetown Bridge at the Kentucky-Illinois state line to KY 81 near Owensboro via Morgantown and Sebree.

Major intersections

References

0056
Transportation in Union County, Kentucky
Transportation in Webster County, Kentucky
Transportation in McLean County, Kentucky
Transportation in Daviess County, Kentucky